The 1988 All-Ireland Senior Camogie Championship. The championship was won by Kilkenny who defeated Cork by a six-point margin in the final. The match drew an attendance of 4,000. It was the first All-Ireland championship to be played over the extended time period of 60 minutes.

Semi-finals
Kilkenny had a massive 21-point victory over Galway and Cork defeated Wexford by seven points in the All-Ireland semi-finals.

Final
Ann Leahy scored after just 12 seconds in one of the quickest goals in a final of the All Ireland camogie championship;. Breda Holmes scored two goals and Clare Jones scored another as Kilkenny won the final. Cork were 2-2 to 1-5 behind at half time in the final. Cork’s jersey numbers proved hard to read. Pat Roche complained in the Irish Times:
Nobody on a losing side wishes to be easily identified but this was stretching it too far. Cork’s challenge may not have faded into obscurity like the numbers of their backs, but they were held at bay long enough for Kilkenny to record their fourth successive triumph.. Though Cork trailed by 3-3 to 1-5 at the interval, they challenged gamely to be in with a chance in the closing stages. That Cork’s chances were alive playing into the teeth of a strong downfield breeze in the closing stages was due to their persistence around the Kilkenny posts and the probings of Linda Mellerick.

Final stages

References

External links

1988 in camogie
1988